Paul Maar (born 13 December 1937) is one of the most important modern German writers for children and young people. He is a novelist, playwright, translator and illustrator.

Life
Maar was born in Schweinfurt. After the early death of his mother he lived with his grandfather in the rural area of Theres in northern Bavaria. He went to school at the Gymnasium in Schweinfurt, and later studied at the State Academy of Arts in Stuttgart. He then worked as a stage designer and stage photographer for the Franconian castle theatre Massbach. After that he spent ten years as an art teacher. Since 1976, he has worked as a freelance writer.  He lives in Bamberg with his wife and three children.

Bibliography 
Maar is the author of a large number of novels, short stories and plays. His most read works are a series of books about Sams, a creature with red hair and a pig's nose that can grant wishes and, if it does, shows up on Sams-Day (i. e., Saturday), and the stories about the Little Kangaroo. He has also written many of the Augsburger Puppenkiste classics.

 Der tätowierte Hund (Oetinger, English: The Tattooed Dog, 1968) 
 Der verhexte Knödeltopf (1970)
 Der König in der Kiste (1971)
 Kikerikiste (1972)
 Summelsarium (1973)
 Eine Woche voller Samstage (1973)
 Andere Kinder wohnen auch bei ihren Eltern (1976)
 Onkel Florians fliegender Flohmarkt (1977)
 Am Samstag kam das Sams zurück (1980)
 Die Eisenbahn-Oma (1981)
 Die vergessene Tür (1982)
 Anne will ein Zwilling werden (1982)
 Tier-ABC (1983)
 Lippels Traum (1984)
 Kindertheaterstücke (1984)
 Die Opodeldocks (1985)
 Robert und Trebor (1985)
 Der Tag an dem Tante Marga verschwand und andere Geschichten (1986)
 Türme (1987)
 Konrad Knifflichs Knobelkoffer (1987)
 Dann wird es wohl das Nashorn sein (1988)
 Das kleine Känguru auf Abenteuer (1989)
 Kartoffelkäferzeiten (1990)
 Das kleine Känguru lernt fliegen (1990)
 Das kleine Känguruh und seine Freunde (1991)
 Das kleine Känguruh und der Angsthase (1991)
 Neue Punkte für das Sams (1992)
 Anne macht alles nach (1992)
 Neben mir ist noch Platz (1993)
 Neue Kindertheaterstücke (1993)
 Jacob und der große Junge (1993)
 Tina und Timmi kennen sich nicht (1995)
 Ein Sams für Martin Taschenbier (1996)
 Der gelbe Pulli (1996)
 Der Buchstabenfresser (1996)
 Die Maus, die hat Geburtstag heut (1997)
 Kreuz und Rüben, Kraut und quer (1997)
 Tina und Timmi machen einen Ausflug (1997)
 Matti, Momme und die Zauberbohnen (1997)
 Das kleine Känguru in Gefahr (1998)
 In einem tiefen, dunklen Wald (1999)
 Das Sams wird Filmstar (2001)
 Tierische Freundschaften (2001)
 Sams in Gefahr (2002)
 Die Kuh Gloria (2002)
 Hase und Bär (2003)
 Friedlich schlafen kleine Drachen (2003)
 Große Schwester, fremder Bruder (2004)
 Wer ist der Größte? (2004)
 Herr Bello und das blaue Wunder (2005)
 Der verborgene Schatz  (2005)
 Onkel Alwin und das Sams (2009)

Three films have been made of the Sams books: 
Das Sams (English The Slurb) - 2001
 (English name My Magical Friend Sams) - 2003
Sams im Glück - 2012.

Notes

External links 
 
 Paul Maars Homepage: Das Sams 
 author page at Lyrikline.org , with audio, text, and one Persian translation.

1937 births
Living people
People from Schweinfurt
German children's writers
Academic staff of the University of Oldenburg
German male writers
Officers Crosses of the Order of Merit of the Federal Republic of Germany